The Kivu conflict began in 2004 in the eastern Congo as an armed conflict between the military of the Democratic Republic of the Congo (FARDC) and the Hutu Power group Democratic Forces for the Liberation of Rwanda (FDLR) in the Democratic Republic of the Congo. It has broadly consisted of three phases, the third of which is an ongoing conflict. Prior to March 2009, the main combatant group against the FARDC was the National Congress for the Defence of the People (CNDP). Following the cessation of hostilities between these two forces, rebel Tutsi forces, formerly under the command of Laurent Nkunda, became the dominant opposition to the government forces.

The United Nations Mission in the Democratic Republic of Congo (MONUSCO) has played a large role in the conflict. With a 21,000-strong force, the Kivu conflict constitutes the largest peacekeeping mission currently in operation. In total, 93 peacekeepers have died in the region, with 15 dying in a large-scale attack by an Islamist militia, the Allied Democratic Forces, in North Kivu in December 2017. The peacekeeping force seeks to prevent escalation of force in the conflict, and minimise human rights abuses like sexual assault and the use of child soldiers.

CNDP is sympathetic to the Banyamulenge in Eastern Congo, an ethnic Tutsi group, and to the Tutsi-dominated government of neighboring Rwanda. It was opposed by the FDLR, by the DRC army, and by United Nations forces.

Background

Laurent Nkunda was an officer in the rebel Rally for Congolese Democracy (RCD), Goma faction in the Second Congo War (1998–2002). The rebel group, backed by Rwanda, was seeking to overthrow then Congolese president Laurent-Désiré Kabila. In 2003, when that war officially ended, Nkunda joined the new integrated national army of the transitional government of Congo as a colonel and was promoted to general in 2004. He soon rejected the authority of the government and retreated with some of RCD-Goma troops to the Masisi forests in Nord Kivu.

Global Witness says that Western companies sourcing minerals were buying them from traders who finance both rebel and government troops. Minerals such as cassiterite, gold, or coltan, which is used for electronic equipment and cell phones, are an important export for the Congo. A UN resolution stated that anyone supporting illegal Congolese armed groups through illicit trade of natural resources should be subjected to sanctions including travel restrictions and an assets freeze. The extent of the problem is not known.

History

FDLR insurgency
The FDLR counts among its number the original members of the Interahamwe that led the 1994 Rwandan genocide. It received extensive backing from, and cooperation from, the government of Congolese President Laurent-Désiré Kabila, who used the FDLR as a proxy force against the foreign Rwandan armies operating in the country, in particular the Rwandan Patriotic Army (RPF military wing) and Rwanda-backed Rally for Congolese Democracy. In July 2002, FDLR units still in Kinshasa-held territory moved into North and South Kivu. At this time it was thought to have between 15,000 and 20,000 members. Even after the official end of the Second Congo War in 2002, FDLR units continued to attack Tutsi forces both in eastern DRC and across the border into Rwanda, vastly increasing tensions in the region and raising the possibility of another Rwandan offensive into the DRC – what would be their third since 1996. In mid-2004, a number of attacks forced 25,000 Congolese to flee their homes.

2004–2009: Nkunda's CNDP rebellion
In early 2004, the peace procedure was already starting to unravel in North Kivu. Under the terms of the deal, all belligerents were to join a transitional government and merge their forces into one national army. However, it quickly became clear that not all parties were fully committed to peace. An early sign of this was the defection of three senior Rally for Congolese Democracy (RCD) officers – among them Laurent Nkunda – to form a political movement that morphed into the National Congress for the Defence of the People (CNDP) rebellion in July 2006. The region was once again plunged into turmoil, with fighting reaching the intensity of the Second Congo War. Whilst Mai Mai (self-defence militias) were responsible for some of this violence, the struggle between the CNDP and the Forces démocratiques de libération du Rwanda (FDLR) – the largest Rwandan Hutu group – was at its heart.

2004 Bukavu offensive
In 2004, Nkunda's forces began clashing with the DRC army in Sud-Kivu and occupied Bukavu for eight days in June 2004, where he was accused of committing war crimes. Nkunda claimed he was attempting to prevent genocide against the Banyamulenge, who are ethnic Tutsi resident in the eastern DRC. This claim was rejected by the UN Organization Stabilization Mission in the Democratic Republic of the Congo (MONUSCO). Following UN negotiations which secured the withdrawal of Nkunda's troops from Bukavu to the Masisi forests, part of his army split. Led by Colonel Jules Mutebusi, it left for Rwanda. About 150,000 Kinyarwanda-speaking people (of Nkunda's own language group) were reported to have fled from Sud-Kivu to Nord-Kivu in fear of reprisal attacks by DRC army.

2005 clashes with DRC army
In 2005, Nkunda called for the overthrow of the government due to its corruption, and increasing numbers of RCD-Goma soldiers deserted the DRC army to join his forces.

2006
In January 2006, Nkunda's troops clashed with DRC army forces, who had also been accused of war crimes by the MONUC. Further clashes took place during August 2006 around the town of Sake. MONUC, however, refused to arrest Nkunda after an international arrest warrant was issued against him, stating, "Mr Laurent Nkunda does not present a threat to the local population, thus we cannot justify any action against him." As late as June 2006, Nkunda became subject to United Nations Security Council restrictions.

During both the first and second rounds of the contested and violent 2006 general election, Nkunda had said that he would respect the results. On 25 November, however, a day before the Supreme Court ruled that Joseph Kabila had won the presidential election's second round, Nkunda's forces undertook a sizeable offensive in Sake against the DRC army 11th Brigade, also clashing with MONUC peacekeepers. The attack may not have been related to the election but due to the "killing of a Tutsi civilian who was close to one of the commanders in this group."

The UN called on the DRC government to negotiate with Nkunda, and DRC Interior Minister, General Denis Kalume, was sent to eastern DRC to begin negotiations.

On 7 December 2006, RCD-Goma troops attacked DRC army positions in Nord Kivu. With military assistance from MONUC, the DRC army was reported to have regained their positions, with about 150 RCD-Goma forces having been killed. Approximately 12,000 Congolese civilians have fled the DRC to Kisoro District, Uganda. Also on that day, a rocket fired from the DRC to the Kisoro District, killing seven people.

2007
In early 2007, the central DRC government attempted to reduce the threat posed by Nkunda by trying to integrate his troops further into the FARDC, the national armed forces, in what was called a 'mixage' process. However, this backfired and it now appears that from about January to August Nkunda controlled five brigades of troops rather than two. On 24 July 2007, the UN peacekeeping head Jean-Marie Guehenno stated, "Mr Nkunda's forces are the single most serious threat to stability in the DR Congo." In early September, Nkunda's forces had a smaller DRC force under siege in Masisi, and MONUC helicopters were ferrying government soldiers to relieve the town. Scores of men were reported killed, and another major conflict was in progress.

On 5 September 2007, after the government FARDC forces claimed they had used a Mil Mi-24 helicopter gunship to kill 80 of Nkunda's rebels, Nkunda called on the government to return to a peace process. "It's the government side who have broken the peace process. We are asking the government to get back on the peace process, because it is the real way to resolve the Congolese problem", he said In September, Nkunda's men "raided ten secondary schools and four primary schools where they took the children by force in order to make them join their ranks." According to United Nations officials, girls were taken as sex slaves, boys were used as fighters, in violation of international law. Following the date of the UN report, thousands more Congolese fled their homes for displaced persons camps.

The government set a 15 October 2007 deadline for Nkunda's troops to begin disarming. This deadline passed without action and, on 17 October, President Joseph Kabila ordered the military to prepare to disarm Nkunda's forces forcibly. Government forces advanced on the Nkunda stronghold of Kichanga. Thousands of civilians fleeing the fighting between Nkunda and government-allied Mai-Mai around Bunagana arrived in Rutshuru several days later. There were separate reports of government troops engaging units under Nkunda around Bukima, near Bunagana, as well as some refugees fleeing across the border into Uganda. The number of people displaced by the fighting since the beginning of the year was estimated at over 370,000.

Three neighbouring villages were also reported captured, and the army outpost abandoned. A government offensive in early December resulted in the capture by the 82nd Brigade of the town of Mushake, overlooking a key road (however, Reuters reports a FARDC integrated brigade, the 14th, took the town). This followed a statement by the United Nations Mission in the Democratic Republic of Congo that it would be willing to offer artillery support to the government offensive. In a regional conference held in Addis Ababa, the United States, Burundi, Rwanda and Uganda pledged to support the Congolese government and not support "negative forces", widely seen as code for Nkunda's forces.

Nkunda stated on 14 December 2007 that he was open to peace talks. The government called such talks on 20 December to be held from 27 December 2007 to 5 January 2008. These talks were then postponed to be held from 6 to 14 January 2008.

January 2008 peace deal
Nkunda's group did attend the talks, but walked out on 10 January 2008, after an alleged attempted arrest of one of their members. They later returned to the talks. The talks' schedule was extended to last until 21 January 2008, and then to 22 January 2008 as an agreement appeared to be within reach. It was further extended to 23 January 2008 over final disagreements regarding war crimes cases. The peace deal was signed on 23 January 2008 and included provisions for an immediate ceasefire, the phased withdrawal of all rebel forces in North Kivu province, the resettlement of thousands of villagers, and immunity for Nkunda's forces.

The agreement encouraged FARDC and the United Nations to remove FDLR forces from Kivu. Dissatisfaction with progress and lack of resettlement of refugees caused the CNDP forces to declare war on the FDLR and hostilities to resume, including civilian atrocities. Neither the Democratic Forces for the Liberation of Rwanda nor the Rwandan government took part in the talks, a fact which may hurt the stability of the agreement.

Fall 2008 fighting

On 26 October 2008, Nkunda's rebels seized a major military camp, along with Virunga National Park for use as a base to launch attacks from. This occurred after the peace treaty failed, with the resultant fighting displacing thousands. The park was taken due to its strategic location on a main road leading to the city of Goma. On 27 October riots began around the United Nations compound in Goma, and civilians pelted the building with rocks and threw Molotov cocktails, claiming that the UN forces had done nothing to prevent the rebel advance. The Congolese national army also retreated under pressure from the rebel army in a "major retreat".

Attack helicopters and armoured vehicles of UN peacekeepers (MONUC) were used in an effort to halt the advance of the rebels, who claim to be within 7 miles (11 kilometres) of Goma. Special Representative of the UN Secretary-General for DRC Alan Doss explained the necessity of engaging the rebels, stating that "...[the UN] can't allow population centers to be threatened... [the UN] had to engage." On 28 October, rebels and combined government-MONUC troops battled between the Kibumba refugee camp and Rutshuru. Five rockets were fired at a convoy of UN vehicles protecting a road to the territorial capital of Rutshuru, hitting two armoured personnel carriers. The APCs, which contained Indian Army troops, were relatively undamaged, though a Lieutenant Colonel and two other personnel were injured. Rebel forces later captured the town. Meanwhile, civilians continued to riot, at some points pelting retreating Congolese troops with rocks, though UN spokeswoman Sylvie van den Wildenberg stated that the UN has "reinforced [their] presence" in the region.

On 29 October, the rebels declared a unilateral ceasefire as they approached Goma, though they still intended to take the city. That same day a French request for an EU reinforcement of 1,500 troops was refused by several countries and appeared unlikely to materialise; however, the UN forces in place stated they would act to prevent takeovers of population centres. Throughout the day the streets of the city were filled with refugees and fleeing troops, including their tanks and other military vehicles. There were also reports of looting and commandeering of cars by Congolese troops. That night the UN Security Council unanimously adopted a non-binding resolution which condemned the recent rebel advance and demanded it be halted. Despite the ceasefire, World Vision workers had to flee to the Rwandan border to work, and shots were still fired. The United States Department of State sent Assistant Secretary of State for African Affairs Jendayi Frazer as an envoy to the region.

On 30 October, looting and violence by Congolese soldiers, some of them drunk, continued in Goma, though contingents of other troops and paramilitary police attempted to contain the looting by patrolling the streets in pick-up trucks. Nkunda called for direct talks with the Congolese government, also stating that he would take Goma "if there is no ceasefire, no security and no advance in the peace process." On 31 October, Nkunda declared that he would create a "humanitarian aid corridor", a no-fire zone where displaced persons would be allowed back to their homes, given the consent of the United Nations task force in the Congo. Working with the UN forces around Goma, Nkunda hoped to relocate victims of the recent fighting between his CNDP forces and UN peacekeepers. MONUC spokesman Kevin Kennedy stated that MONUC's forces were stretched thin trying to keep peace within and around the city; recent looting by Congolese soldiers had made it harder to do so as incidents arose both within city limits and outside. According to Anneke Van Woudenberg, a Human Rights Watch researcher, more than 20 people were killed overnight in Goma alone. Meanwhile, Secretary of State Condoleezza Rice contacted Rwandan President Paul Kagame to discuss a long-term solution. Also, on 31 October, British Foreign Minister David Miliband and French Foreign Minister Bernard Kouchner flew to the region, with the intention of stopping in Kinshasa, Goma, and possibly Kigali.

On 6 November, rebels broke the ceasefire and wrested control of another town in eastern Democratic Republic of Congo in clashes with government forces on the eve of a regional summit on the crisis. National Congress for the Defence of the People (CNDP) rebels seized control of the centre of Nyanzale, an important army base in Nord-Kivu province after government forces fled. Residents reported that rebels had shot dead civilians suspected of supporting pro-government militia.

Angolan involvement
In November 2008, during the clashes around Goma, a UN source reported that Angolan troops were seen taking part in combat operations alongside government forces. Kinshasa repeatedly denied that foreign troops were on its soil — an assertion echoed by the UN mission, which has 17,000 blue-helmeted peacekeepers on the ground. There is "military cooperation" between Congo and Angola, and that "there are perhaps Angolan (military) instructors in country", according to the UN. Angola, a former Portuguese colony, sided with Kinshasa in the 1998–2003 Second Congo War that erupted when Democratic Republic of Congo was in a massive rebellion.

Capture of Nkunda and peace treaty

On 22 January 2009, the Rwandan military, during a joint operation with the Congolese Army, captured Nkunda as he fled from DR Congo into neighbouring Rwanda. Rwandan officials have yet to say if he will be handed over to DR Congo, which has issued an international warrant for his arrest. A military spokesperson said Nkunda had been seized after sending three battalions to repel an advance by a joint Congolese-Rwandan force. The force was part of a joint Congolese-Rwandan operation which was launched to hunt Rwandan Hutu militiamen operating in DR Congo. Nkunda is currently being held at an undisclosed location in Rwanda. A Rwandan military spokesman has claimed, however, that Nkunda is being held at Gisenyi, a city in Rubavu district in the Western Province of Rwanda. DR Congo's government suggested his capture would end the activities of one of the country's most feared rebel groups, recently split by a leadership dispute.

With the ending of the joint Rwandan-DRC offensive against Hutu militiamen responsible for the 1994 Genocide in Rwanda, the Kivu conflict effectively ended. On 23 March 2009, the CNDP signed a peace treaty with the government, in which it agreed to become a political party in exchange for the release of its members.

2009–2012
Over the weekend of 9/10 May 2009, FDLR Rwandan Hutu rebels were blamed for attacks on the villages of Ekingi and Busurungi in Congo's eastern South Kivu province. More than 90 people were killed at Ekingi, including 60 civilians and 30 government troops, and "dozens more" were said to be killed at Busurungi. The FDLR were blamed by the United Nations' Office for the Coordination of Humanitarian Affairs; the UN's peacekeeping force, MONUC, and the Congolese Army investigated the attacks. The FDLR had attacked several other villages in the preceding weeks and clashes occurred between FDLR forces and the Congolese Army, during which government forces are reported to have lost men. The Congolese Army and MONUC were planning operations in South Kivu to eliminate the FDLR.

On 18 August, three Indian UN soldiers were killed by Mai-Mai rebels in a surprise attack at a MONUSCO base in Kirumba, Nord-Kivu. On 23 October, Mai-Mai rebels attacked a MONUSCO base in Rwindi ( north of Kirumba). UN troops killed 8 rebels in the battle.

M23 rebellion

In March 2009, the CNDP had signed a peace treaty with the government, in which it agreed to become a political party in exchange for the release of its imprisoned members. In April 2012, former National Congress for the Defence of the People (CNDP) soldiers mutinied against the government. The mutineers formed a rebel group called the March 23 Movement (M23). Former CNDP commander Bosco Ntaganda, known as "the Terminator" is accused of founding the movement. On 4 April, it was reported that Ntaganda and 300 loyal troops defected from the DRC and clashed with government forces in the Rutshuru region north of Goma. Africa Confidential said on 25 May 2012 that "the revolt now seems to be as much about resisting an attempt by Kinshasa to disrupt CNDP networks in the restive Kivu provinces, a process of which Ntaganda may find himself a casualty."

On 20 November 2012, the M23 took control of Goma after the national army retreated westward. MONUSCO, the United Nations peacekeeping force, watched the takeover without intervening, stating that its mandate allowed it only to protect civilians. M23 withdrew from Goma in early December following negotiations with the government and regional powers.

On 24 February 2013, leaders of 11 African nations signed an agreement designed to bring peace to the eastern region of the Democratic Republic of Congo. The M23 rebels were not represented in the deal's negotiations or at the signing. Following disagreements in the M23 about how to react to the peace agreements, M23 political coordinator Jean-Marie Runiga Lugerero, was sacked by its military chief Sultani Makenga. Makenga declared himself interim leader and clashes between those loyal to him and those loyal to Jean-Marie Runiga Lugerero, who is allied with Bosco Ntaganda, have killed ten men and two others were hospitalised.

In March 2013, the United Nations Security Council authorized the deployment of an intervention brigade within MONUSCO to carry out targeted offensive operations, with or without the Congolese national army, against armed groups that threaten peace in eastern DRC. It is the first peacekeeping unit tasked with carrying out offensive operations.

2013: MONUSCO intervention 

On 28 March 2013, faced with recurrent waves of conflict in eastern DRC threatening the overall stability and development of the country and wider Great Lakes region, the Security Council decided, by its Resolution 2098, to create a specialized "intervention brigade" for an initial period of one year and within the authorized MONUSCO troop ceiling of 19,815. It would consist of three infantry battalions, one artillery and one special force and reconnaissance company and operate under direct command of the MONUSCO Force Commander, with the responsibility of neutralizing armed groups and the objective of contributing to reducing the threat posed by armed groups to state authority and civilian security in eastern DRC and to make space for stabilization activities.

The council also decided that MONUSCO shall strengthen the presence of its military, police and civilian components in eastern DRC and reduce, to the fullest extent possible for the implementation of its mandate, its presence in areas not affected by conflict in particular Kinshasa and in western DRC.

The last batch of the Malawi troops committed to the MONUSCO Force Intervention Brigade arrived in Goma, North Kivu province, on 7 October 2013. They will be part of the 3000- strong force to which Tanzania and South Africa are the other two troop contributing countries.

Since the arrival of its first troops in June 2013, the Intervention Brigade has already gone into action resulting in the withdrawal of M23,  from its initial positions in Kanyaruchinya, on 31 August 2013.

The Intervention Brigade is now at its full strength with the arrival of the Malawi infantry battalion. Tanzania, South Africa and Malawi have been picked for the UN Stabilization Mission in DR Congo (MONUSCO) because of the wide experience they gained in other UN Peacekeeping missions. For instance, 95 percent of the Malawi troops have been already in peacekeeping missions in Kosovo, Liberia, Rwanda, Sudan, and they are well prepared to face any operational challenges.

2015–2016 resurgence

In January 2015, it was reported that UN and Congo troops were preparing an offensive on FDLR in the Kivu region, while striking  FNL-Nzabampema positions on Eastern Congo on 5 January 2015. Several days earlier an infiltration by an unknown rebel group from Eastern Congo to Burundi left 95 rebels and 2 Burundi soldiers dead.

On 13 January 2015, the Congolese military held a press conference announcing the destruction of four of the 20 militant factions operating in South Kivu. The Raïa Mutomboki armed group will undergo disarmament. A total of 39 rebels were killed and 24 captured since the start of the Sokola 2 operation in October 2014, 55 weapons and large quantities of ammunition were also seized. FARDC casualties amounted to 8 killed and 4 wounded.

On 25 January 2015, 85 Raïa Mutomboki rebels surrendered to the authorities in the town of Mubambiro, North Kivu; the former militants will be gradually integrated into FARDC. Earlier in January, Raïa Mutomboki, founder Nyanderema, approached the town of Luizi with a group of 9 fighters, announcing their abandonment of armed struggle. 24 rifles, 2 grenades and other military equipment was transferred to FARDC during the two incidents.

On 31 January, the DRC troops launched a campaign against the FDLR Hutu rebels. On 13 March 2015, a military spokesman announced that a total of 182 FDLR rebels were killed since the start of the January offensive. Large amounts of weaponry and ammunition were seized, as the army recaptured the towns of Kirumba Kagondo, Kahumiro, Kabwendo, Mugogo, Washing 1 and 2, Kisimba 1, 2 and 3, among other locales.

In January 2016, fighting broke out between the FDLR, ADF and Mai-Mai militias, which resulted in thousands fleeing to surrounding areas in North Kivu's Goma
.

2017–2021: ADF and Islamic insurgency
 
Approximately 1.7 million were forced to flee their homes in the DR Congo in 2017 as a result of intensified fighting. Ulrika Blom, a relief worker from Norway, has noted the magnitude of the refugee crisis by comparing the numbers to Yemen, Syria, and Iraq.

27 January 2017 — .

On 27 September 2017, fighting erupted in Uvira as anti-government rebels of the CNPSC attempted to capture the city. This was part of an offensive launched in June of the same year.

On 7 December 2017, an attack orchestrated by the Allied Democratic Forces on a UN base in Semuliki in the North Kivu region resulted in the death of at least 15 UN peacekeepers from the MONUSCO mission. This attack drew international criticism, with UN Secretary-General António Guterres describing the incident, the worst altercation involving peacekeepers in recent history, as a "war crime". The assault, in terms of fatalities, was the most severe suffered by peacekeepers since an ambush in Somalia in 1993. The peacekeeping regiment that came under attack was composed of troops from Tanzania. In addition to the peacekeepers, five soldiers from the FARDC were killed in the attack. Analysts felt that the size and scale of the attack was unprecedented, but that it represented another step in the conflict which has been prevalent in the region for many years. The motivation for the attack was unknown, but it was expected to further destabilise the region. The Congolese forces claimed that the Islamist ADF lost 72 militants in the attack, raising the total number of fatalities in excess of 90.

During 2018, ADF carried out numerous attacks to Beni, inflicting high casualties to civilians and government soldiers:

 23 September 2018, ADF raided the town of Beni, killing at least 16 people, including four government soldiers.
 21 October 2018, ADF rebels attacked the town of Matete, just north of Beni, resulting in 11 civilians killed and 15 people were kidnapped (ten of which were children ages five to ten years old). This prompted aid workers to suspend efforts to roll back an outbreak of deadly Ebola.

In addition, on 16 December 2018, Maï-Maï militiamen attacked the Independent National Electoral Commission (CENI) warehouse in Beni ahead of 23 December election, security forces repel attackers without suffering casualties. According to the Congo Research Group (a study project at New York University), as of 2018, 134 armed groups are active in North and South Kivu.

On 31 October 2019, the Congolese army launched a large scale offensive against the ADF in the Beni Territory of the North Kivu Province. According to spokesman General Leon Richard Kasonga, "The DRC armed forces launched large-scale operations overnight Wednesday to eradicate all domestic and foreign armed groups that plague the east of the country and destabilize the Great Lakes region." The operation is being carried out by the FARDC without any foreign support. The focus is primarily on the ADF but also other armed groups are being targeted.

On 13 January 2020, the Congolese army raided ADF's headquarters camp, nicknamed "Madina", which is located near Beni. 30 Congolese soldiers were killed and 70 were wounded in the intense battle with ADF. 40 ADF insurgents were also reported killed, including five top commanders. The Congolese army nevertheless captures the camp, but fails to apprehend the target of the raid, ADF leader Musa Baluku.

On 26 May 2020, at least 40 civilians were killed with machetes by the ADF in Ituri province.

On 16 September 2020, the DRC and 70 armed groups active in South Kivu agreed to cease hostilities.

On 20 October 2020, more than 1,300 prisoners escaped from a jail in Beni after an attack claimed by the ISCAP (Islamic State's Central Africa Province).

On 26 October 2020, The Congolese armed forces took control of the headquarters of Burundi rebel group National Forces of Liberation (NFL) after three days of intense fighting. The army also said they fought some members of the National Resistance Council for Democracy (NRCD). Troops killed 27 rebels, seizing arms and ammunition, while three soldiers died in the fighting, with another four wounded. Now the rebels are fleeing toward the forests of Muranvia, Nyaburunda and Kashongo as well as the Nyanzale Rudaga valley.

On 31 December 2020, Allied Democratic Forces (ADF) massacred 25 civilians in the village of Tingwe. On 1 January 2021, the village of Loselose was recaptured by DRC after a battle between Congolese army, supported by UN peacekeepers and ADF. Two Congolese soldiers and 14 Islamist militants were killed, seven Congolese soldiers were wounded.

On 4 January 2021, ADF attacked villages of Tingwe, Mwenda and Nzenga and killed 25 civilians and kidnapped several others. DRC authorities also discovered 21 civilian bodies "in a state of decomposition" in Loselose and Loulo.

On 4 February 2021, ISIS operatives exchanged fire with Congolese soldiers in the Rwenzori region, on the border between the Democratic Republic of Congo and Uganda. Three soldiers were killed and several others were wounded. The other soldiers fled. ISIS operatives seized vehicles, weapons and ammunition.

On 22 February 2021, the Italian ambassador to DR Congo Luca Attanasio, an Italian law enforcement official and a driver were killed in an attack on a UN convoy near the town of Kanyamahoro, 16 kilometers north of Goma.

On 26 February 2021, IS operatives killed at least 35 Congolese soldiers and wounded many more after a Congolese army force approached IS positions in Losilosi, in the Beni region.

On 6 March 2021, IS militants attacked Congolese forces in a village in the Irumu region. During the attack, at least 7 soldiers were killed and the rest fled. IS operative seized weapons and ammunition.

On 31 March 2021, ADF militants linked to ISIS, massacred 23 civilians after attacking a village in the Beni region.

On 9 April 2021, two civilians trucks transporting Christian civilians were targeted by ISIL gunfire southeast of Beni. 5 of the passengers were killed. A Congolese soldier was also shot dead in the area on the same day.

On 23 April 2021, Congolese army camps were targeted by ISCAP militants in the Oicha region. One Congolese soldier was killed in the attacks.

On 30 April 2021, president Felix Tshisekedi declared a "state of siege" over the province of North Kivu that went into effect on 6 May. The state of siege will last for 30 days in which the province will be under military rule.

On 5 May 2021, the FARDC attacked and captured the village of Nyabiondo from APCLS. During the fighting a woman was wounded.

On 24 May 2021, ISIS operatives attacked a Congolese army camp near Kanjabai Prison, in the Beni region, about 50 km west of the Congo-Uganda border. Two soldiers were killed in the exchange of fire. ISIS operatives set fire to the camp.

On 29 June 2021, two Congolese soldiers were killed after ISCAP attacked their positions in the Ituri region.

On 29 July 2021, ISCAP militants attack a convoy of Christian civilians on the Ituri-Beni highway, killing one civilians and destroying 6 vehicles.

On 9 August, ISIL forces took control of the villages of Mavivi and Malibungo in the Ituri region, killing at least one Congolese soldier and capturing 3 others.

On 13 September, ISCAP forces attacked a village in the Ituri region, burning down the homes of several Christians and executing at least one Congolese soldier.

2022: M23 resurgence 

From 28 March 2022, the M23 Movement launched a new offensive in North Kivu, allegedly with Rwandan and Ugandan support. The offensive resulted in the displacement of tens of thousands of refugees, while the rebels had been able to capture some territory by June.

Towns and villages on the list of combat activities were; Beni, Kanyabayonga, Rutshuru, Rumangabo, Goma, Walikale, Bannyahe, 
Rubavu, Sake, Masisi and Bunagana. War broke out in other areas like Nyagatare, Butare, Bukavu, Fizi and Uvira. M23 has to form a governing alliance with the fighting parties. General S.Makenga was the military commander of M23. The number of refugees has doubled, the first groups of refugees have not been resettled.

Human rights abuses

Child recruitment by the armed groups

Violence is widespread: "In Masisi 99.1% (897/905) and Kitchanga 50.4% (509/1020) of households reported at least one member subjected to violence. Displacement was reported by 39.0% of households (419/1075) in Kitchanga and 99.8% (903/905) in Masisi," one study found.

Many armed groups participating in the conflict have used children as active combatants. According to the report published [on 23 October 2013], almost 1,000 cases of child recruitment by armed groups were verified by MONUSCO between 1 January 2012 and 31 August 2013, predominantly in the district of North Kivu. The use of child soldiers in the Kivu conflict constitutes another example of the use of child soldiers in the DRC. The UN has asserted that some of the girls being used as belligerents are also subjected to sexual assault, and are treated as sex slaves.

Sexual violence in the Democratic Republic of the Congo

The Kivu conflict has created chaos and disorder in the regions of North and South Kivu. MONUSCO believe that widespread sexual assault has been perpetrated against women in this regions by all sides of the conflict, something which the UNHCR has condemned. Incidents have involved the rape and sexual assault of both women and girls, included the incorporation of girls into militia forces as sex slaves. The most publicised example of sexual violence occurred in November 2012 in Minova. Having retreated to the town, FARDC troops conducted systematic rape against the women and girls over a period of three days. This resulted in widespread international condemnation, prompting the Army to begin an investigation in order to prosecute the perpetrators of the sexual assaults. In 2014, the "Minova Trial" was conducted. It was the largest rape tribunal in the nation's history. While the American Bar Association, which had an office in Goma, had identified more than 1,000 potential victims, the official list composed by the UN only had 126, of whom 56 testified at the trial. For reasons of safety, those testifying were forced to hide their faces by donning hoods. In the end, only a few junior officers were convicted. Sexual violence in the region has continued, but by 2015, funding had declined for sanctuaries for the women and protection.

Conflict minerals

The role of conflict minerals in the conflict is highly debated. Certain NGOs, like the Enough Project, say that the illegal exploitation of minerals is the main cause of the ongoing violence in the Kivus. A United Nations report supported this view. However, many academic and independent researchers (both Congolese and international) challenge this interpretation, arguing that while conflict minerals are undoubtedly one of the many causes of violence in the region, they are most likely not the most significant and impactful one.

The most prominent and prevalent conflict mineral procured in the Kivu districts is gold. Due to its high financial value, rival militias will attack one another for control of the mineral. An investigation into conflict minerals in relation to the Kivu conflict found that "gold is now, as of 2013, the most important conflict mineral in eastern Congo, with at least 12 tons worth roughly $500 million smuggled out of the east every year." These high financial revenues were identified as the primary incentives for the mining and capture of gold. To illustrate this, this study looked at one specific rebel group, determining that "The M23 rebel group has taken over a profitable part of the conflict gold trade in the east of the Democratic Republic of the Congo...It is using revenues from the illicit trade to benefit its leaders and supporters and fund its military campaign by building military alliances and networks with other armed groups that control territory around gold mines and by smuggling gold through Uganda and Burundi. M23 commander Sultani Makenga, who is also allegedly one of the rebels' main recruiters of child soldiers according to the U.N. Group of Experts on Congo, is at the center of the conflict gold efforts."

Role of European arms 
In 2021, the Transnational Institute published a report about the role of the arms trade in displacements, finding that "between 2012 and 2015 Bulgaria exported assault rifles, large-calibre artillery systems, light machine guns, hand-held under-barrel and mounted grenade launchers to the Democratic Republic of Congo’s national police and military. [...] Bulgarian weapons were in use in North Kivu in 2017 coinciding with the forced displacement of 523,000 people." Highlighting the role of the military in human rights abuses, they write that FARDC soldiers in North Kivu "possessed Bulgarian-manufactured ARSENAL weaponry that had been exported to the DRC." The UN found the FARDC to have been responsible for at least 20% of the human rights violations it documented in this region.

See also
Ituri conflict
List of conflicts in Africa

References

Further reading

External links
Renewed Crisis in North Kivu (HRW)
Friends of the Congo History, reports, press releases, and current conditions in Congo conflict regions.
UN Security Council Report United Nations press release, 26 November 2008

 
Democratic Republic of the Congo–Rwanda relations
Civil wars involving the states and peoples of Africa
History of Katanga
United Nations Force Intervention Brigade
2010s conflicts
2020s conflicts
Bukavu
21st century in the Democratic Republic of the Congo